This is a list of seasons played by A.S. Roma in Italian and European football, from 1978 to the present day. It details the club's achievements in major competitions, and the top scorers for each season.

Key
EC = European Cup (1955–1992)
UCL = UEFA Champions League (1992–)
ICFC = Inter-Cities Fairs Cup (1955–1971)
UC = UEFA Cup (1971–2009)
UEL = UEFA Europa League (2009–)
UECL = UEFA Europa Conference League (2021–)
CWC = UEFA Cup Winners' Cup (1960–1999)

Seasons
As of 25 May 2022

Notes

References
AS Roma's official website
AS Roma statistics

Seasons
 
Roma